Staploe is a village and civil parish located in the Borough of Bedford in Bedfordshire, England.

Staploe was originally a hamlet of Eaton Socon. Under the Local Government Act 1958, Eaton Socon was merged with the neighbouring town of St Neots in Cambridgeshire. Staploe was therefore created as a civil parish in 1965.

The parish of Staploe includes other former parts of Eaton Socon - Duloe, Honeydon,  and Upper Staploe. Bushmead Priory and the hamlet of Bushmead are also in the parish.

References

External links
Staploe Parish Council

Villages in Bedfordshire
Civil parishes in Bedfordshire
Borough of Bedford